D'Nika Lea Romero (born July 17, 1983, in Lubbock, Texas) is an American model.  She is also a former women's basketball player for Texas A&M University.  She is of Spanish descent.

Magazine appearances
Playboy's Sexy Girls Next Door. September 2006 (pgs. 88–93)
SSX Magazine (Esther Baxter Tribute). Sept./Oct. 2006
40/40 issue of SSX Magazine. January 2007
Playboy's Vixens. Feb/Mar 2007 (pgs. 10–13)
Playboy's College Girls. Mar/April 2007 (pgs. 60–65)

References

1983 births
Living people
American women's basketball players
American female models
American people of Spanish descent
Basketball players from Texas
Point guards
Sportspeople from Lubbock, Texas
Texas A&M Aggies women's basketball players
Female models from Texas